Checkerboard Hill, also known as Kowloon Tsai Hill and Tak Mee Mountain, is a small hill in the northern part of the Kowloon peninsula in Hong Kong.

Name 
The hill's name dates back to the time when airline pilots had to navigate towards this hill in order to land on Runway 13 of the now-closed Kai Tak Airport. Pilots would set their onboard navigation systems to fly the Instrument Guidance System (IGS) path straight towards a large red and white checkerboard on the side of the hill, then once the checkerboard pattern was sighted and identified, they would make a low-altitude right-hand turn to align visually with Runway 13.

Kai Tak Airport was demanding for pilots, and it required special training, since the approach to runway 13 could not be flown entirely by instrument, but required instead to aim towards a fixed obstacle, and then break away visually to land on its right.

Closure of Kai Tak 
Following the decommissioning of Kai Tak and the opening of Chek Lap Kok International Airport, the hill and the checkerboard remained abandoned, wherein the latter became faded overgrown with new trees. The checkerboard was not restored probably because it may confuse pilots landing at Chek Lap Kok, since the Kai Tak Runway 13 approach also involved flying over Lantau Island.

2020-2021 restoration 

At the height of the COVID-19 pandemic, between 2020 and 2021, the checkerboard was repainted on both the west and south sides, back to its original colours, and overgrown trees were removed. Both the restored Checkerboard Hill and Kai Tak Runway Park now act as a monument to Kai Tak Airport.

See also 
 Geography of Hong Kong
 List of mountains, peaks and hills in Hong Kong
 Lion Rock

References